The following is an alphabetical list of articles related to the U.S. state of Indiana.

0–9 

.in.us – Internet second-level domain for the state of Indiana
19th state to join the United States of America

A
Adjacent states:

Agriculture in Indiana
Airports in Indiana
Amusement parks in Indiana
Arboreta in Indiana
commons:Category:Arboreta in Indiana
Archaeology of Indiana
:Category:Archaeological sites in Indiana
commons:Category:Archaeological sites in Indiana
Architecture of Indiana
commons:Category:Buildings in Indiana
Art museums and galleries in Indiana
commons:Category:Art museums and galleries in Indiana
Astronomical observatories in Indiana
commons:Category:Astronomical observatories in Indiana
Attorney General of the State of Indiana

B
Birds of Indiana
Botanical gardens in Indiana
commons:Category:Botanical gardens in Indiana
Bridges on the National Register of Historic Places in Indiana
Buildings and structures in Indiana
commons:Category:Buildings and structures in Indiana

C

Canyons and gorges of Indiana
commons:Category:Canyons and gorges of Indiana
Capital of the State of Indiana
Capital punishment in Indiana
Capitol of the State of Indiana
commons:Category:Indiana State Capitol
Casinos in Indiana
Caves of Indiana
commons:Category:Caves of Indiana
Census statistical areas of Indiana
Chicago-Naperville-Joliet, IL-IN-WI Metropolitan Statistical Area
Chicago-Naperville-Michigan City, IL-IN-WI Combined Statistical Area
Cincinnati Arch
Cities in Indiana
commons:Category:Cities in Indiana

Climate of Indiana
Climate change in Indiana 
Colleges and universities in Indiana
commons:Category:Universities and colleges in Indiana
Communications in Indiana
commons:Category:Communications in Indiana
Companies in Indiana
Congressional districts of Indiana
Constitution of the State of Indiana
Convention centers in Indiana
commons:Category:Convention centers in Indiana
Corydon, Indiana, territorial and state capital 1813-1825
Counties of the state of Indiana
commons:Category:Counties in Indiana
Courts of Indiana
Crime in Indiana
Culture of Indiana
commons:Category:Indiana culture

D
Demographics of Indiana

E
Economy of Indiana
:Category:Economy of Indiana
commons:Category:Economy of Indiana
Education in Indiana
:Category:Education in Indiana
commons:Category:Education in Indiana
Elections in the State of Indiana
:Category:Indiana elections
commons:Category:Indiana elections
Electoral reform in Indiana
Environment of Indiana
commons:Category:Environment of Indiana

F

Festivals in Indiana
commons:Category:Festivals in Indiana
Flag of the state of Indiana
Flyover state
Former state highways in Indiana
Forts in Indiana
:Category:Forts in Indiana
commons:Category:Forts in Indiana

G

Geography of Indiana
:Category:Geography of Indiana
commons:Category:Geography of Indiana
Geology of Indiana
commons:Category:Geology of Indiana
Ghost towns in Indiana
:Category:Ghost towns in Indiana
commons:Category:Ghost towns in Indiana
Golf clubs and courses in Indiana
Government of the state of Indiana  website
:Category:Government of Indiana
commons:Category:Government of Indiana
Governor of the State of Indiana
List of governors of Indiana
Great Seal of the State of Indiana
Gun laws in Indiana

H
Heritage railroads in Indiana
commons:Category:Heritage railroads in Indiana
High schools of Indiana
Higher education in Indiana
Highway routes in Indiana
Hiking trails in Indiana
commons:Category:Hiking trails in Indiana
History of Indiana
Historical outline of Indiana
:Category:History of Indiana
commons:Category:History of Indiana
Hoosier
Hospitals in Indiana
House of Representatives of the State of Indiana

I
Images of Indiana
commons:Category:Indiana
IN – United States Postal Service postal code for the state of Indiana
Indiana  website
:Category:Indiana
commons:Category:Indiana
commons:Category:Maps of Indiana
Indiana Air National Guard
Indiana Code
Indiana Court of Appeals
Indiana Day
Indiana Department of Administration
Indiana Department of Education
Indiana Department of Natural Resources
Indiana Department of Transportation
Indiana E-Learning Academy
Indiana Free Library
Indiana General Assembly
Indiana Humanities
Indiana Judicial Nominating Commission
Indiana National Guard
Indiana Office of Community & Rural Affairs
Indiana Philosophical Association
Indiana State Auditor
Indiana State Museum
Indiana State Police
Indiana State Treasurer
Indiana State University
Indiana Statehouse
Indiana Superintendent of Public Instruction
Indiana Toll Road
Indiana Township Trustee
Indiana University
Indiana University Cinema
Indianapolis, Indiana, state capital since 1825
Indianapolis 500-Mile Race
Interstate highway routes in Indiana
Islands in Indiana

J

K
 Kankakee Arch
 Kentland crater

L
Lakes of Indiana
Lake Michigan
commons:Category:Lakes of Indiana
Landmarks in Indiana
commons:Category:Landmarks in Indiana
Lieutenant Governor of the State of Indiana
Lists related to the state of Indiana:
List of airports in Indiana
List of birds of Indiana
List of Carnegie libraries in Indiana
List of census-designated places in Indiana
List of census statistical areas in Indiana
List of cities in Indiana
List of colleges and universities in Indiana
List of United States congressional districts in Indiana
List of counties in Indiana
List of flora of Indiana
List of former state highways in Indiana
List of forts in Indiana
List of ghost towns in Indiana
List of governors of Indiana
List of high schools in Indiana
List of hospitals in Indiana
List of individuals executed in Indiana
List of Interstate highway routes in Indiana
List of islands in Indiana
List of law enforcement agencies in Indiana
List of museums in Indiana
List of National Historic Landmarks in Indiana
List of National Natural Landmarks in Indiana
List of newspapers in Indiana
List of people from Indiana
List of power stations in Indiana
List of radio stations in Indiana
List of railroads in Indiana
List of Registered Historic Places in Indiana
List of rivers of Indiana
List of school districts in Indiana
List of state forests in Indiana
List of state parks in Indiana
List of state prisons in Indiana
List of state roads in Indiana
List of symbols of the state of Indiana
List of Superfund sites in Indiana
List of television stations in Indiana
List of towns in Indiana
List of United States congressional delegations from Indiana
List of United States congressional districts in Indiana
List of United States representatives from Indiana
List of United States senators from Indiana
List of U.S. highway routes in Indiana

M
Maps of Indiana
commons:Category:Maps of Indiana
Mass media in Indiana
Museums in Indiana
:Category:Museums in Indiana
commons:Category:Museums in Indiana
Music of Indiana
commons:Category:Music of Indiana
:Category:Musical groups from Indiana
:Category:Musicians from Indiana

N
National Forests of Indiana
commons:Category:National Forests of Indiana
National Register of Historic Places listings in Indiana.  By county:
Adams  Allen  Bartholomew  Benton  Blackford  Boone  Brown  Carroll  Cass  Clark  Clay  Clinton  Crawford  Daviess  Dearborn  Decatur  DeKalb  Delaware  Dubois  Elkhart  Fayette  Floyd  Fountain  Franklin  Fulton  Gibson  Grant  Greene  Hamilton  Hancock  Harrison  Hendricks  Henry  Howard  Huntington  Jackson  Jasper  Jay  Jefferson  Jennings  Johnson  Knox  Kosciusko  LaGrange  Lake  LaPorte  Lawrence  Madison  Marion  Marshall  Martin  Martin  Monroe  Montgomery  Morgan  Newton  Noble  Ohio  Orange  Owen  Parke  Perry  Pike  Porter  Posey  Pulaski  Putnam  Randolph  Ripley  Rush  St. Joseph  Scott  Shelby  Spencer  Starke  Steuben  Sullivan  Switzerland  Tippecanoe  Tipton  Union  Vanderburgh  Vermillion  Vigo  Wabash  Warren  Warrick  Washington  Wayne  Wells  White  Whitley
Railroad property on the National Register of Historic Places in Indiana
Natural arches of Indiana
commons:Category:Natural arches of Indiana
Natural history of Indiana
commons:Category:Natural history of Indiana
Nature centers in Indiana
commons:Category:Nature centers in Indiana
Newspapers of Indiana
Northern Indiana
Northwest Territory, (1787–1800)-1803

O
Ohio River
Outdoor sculptures in Indiana
commons:Category:Outdoor sculptures in Indiana

P
People from Indiana
:Category:People from Indiana
commons:Category:People from Indiana
:Category:People by city in Indiana
:Category:People by county in Indiana
:Category:People from Indiana by occupation
Politics of Indiana
commons:Category:Politics of Indiana
Political party strength in Indiana
Protected areas of Indiana
commons:Category:Protected areas of Indiana

Q

R
Radio stations in Indiana
Railroad museums in Indiana
commons:Category:Railroad museums in Indiana
Railroads in Indiana
Recognition of same-sex unions in Indiana
Registered historic places in Indiana
commons:Category:Registered Historic Places in Indiana
Religion in Indiana
:Category:Religion in Indiana
commons:Category:Religion in Indiana
Rivers of Indiana
commons:Category:Rivers of Indiana
Rock formations in Indiana
commons:Category:Rock formations in Indiana
Roller coasters in Indiana
commons:Category:Roller coasters in Indiana

S
School districts of Indiana
Scouting in Indiana
Secretary of State of Indiana
Senate of the State of Indiana
Settlements in Indiana
Cities in Indiana
Towns in Indiana
Townships in Indiana
Census Designated Places in Indiana
Other unincorporated communities in Indiana
List of ghost towns in Indiana
Ships named honor of Indiana
Southern Indiana
Southwestern Indiana
Sports in Indiana
:Category:Sports in Indiana
commons:Category:Sports in Indiana
:Category:Sports venues in Indiana
commons:Category:Sports venues in Indiana
State of Indiana  website
Constitution of the State of Indiana
Government of the State of Indiana
:Category:Government of Indiana
commons:Category:Government of Indiana
Executive branch of the government of the State of Indiana
Governor of the State of Indiana
Legislative branch of the government of the State of Indiana
General Assembly of the State of Indiana
Senate of the State of Indiana
House of Representatives of the State of Indiana
Speaker of the Indiana House of Representatives
Judicial branch of the government of the State of Indiana
Supreme Court of the State of Indiana
State parks of Indiana
commons:Category:State parks of Indiana
State roads in Indiana
State Police of Indiana
State prisons of Indiana
Structures in Indiana
commons:Category:Buildings and structures in Indiana
Superfund sites in Indiana
Supreme Court of the State of Indiana
Symbols of the State of Indiana
:Category:Symbols of Indiana
commons:Category:Symbols of Indiana

T
Telecommunications in Indiana
commons:Category:Communications in Indiana
Telephone area codes in Indiana
Television shows set in Indiana
Television stations in Indiana
Territory Northwest of the River Ohio, (1787–1800)-1803
Territory of Indiana, 1800–1816
Theatres in Indiana
commons:Category:Theatres in Indiana
Tourism in Indiana  website
commons:Category:Tourism in Indiana
Towns in Indiana
commons:Category:Cities in Indiana
Transportation in Indiana
:Category:Transportation in Indiana
commons:Category:Transport in Indiana

U
United States of America
States of the United States of America
United States census statistical areas of Indiana
United States congressional delegations from Indiana
United States congressional districts in Indiana
United States Court of Appeals for the Seventh Circuit
United States District Court for the Northern District of Indiana
United States District Court for the Southern District of Indiana
United States representatives from Indiana
United States senators from Indiana
Universities and colleges in Indiana
commons:Category:Universities and colleges in Indiana
U.S. highway routes in Indiana
US-IN – ISO 3166-2:US region code for the State of Indiana

V
Vincennes, Indiana, first territorial capital 1800-1813

W
Water parks in Indiana
Waterfalls of Indiana
commons:Category:Waterfalls of Indiana
White River Park State Games
Wikimedia
Wikimedia Commons:Category:Indiana
commons:Category:Maps of Indiana
Wikinews:Category:Indiana
Wikinews:Portal:Indiana
Wikipedia Category:Indiana
Wikipedia Portal:Indiana
Wikipedia:WikiProject Indiana
:Category:WikiProject Indiana articles
:Category:WikiProject Indiana members
Wind power in Indiana

X

Y

Z
Zoos in Indiana
commons:Category:Zoos in Indiana

See also

Topic overview:
Indiana
Outline of Indiana

 1
 
Indiana